Ornoch is a surname. Notable people with the surname include:

Andrew Ornoch (born 1985), Canadian soccer player
Jan Ornoch (born 1952), Polish race walker